Ejen Ali: The Movie is a 2019 Malaysian Malay-language computer-animated spy-fi action film. The film follows a 12-year old spy Agent, Ali, as he embraces his role in MATA, the secret agency, and uncover the secret technology which has threatened the fate of Cyberaya. But unknown to Ali, MATA has also created a new improved version of IRIS, the IRIS NEO, to use the Override at will. While the new device itself begin to use for all agents, Ali question his usefulness to MATA. He is approached by another mysterious person named Niki, who holds a personal connection between Ali. Risking his loyalty to MATA, Ejen Ali will now embarks his thrilling chase to unravel those mysterious links.

Based on the local TV animation series Ejen Ali, it is the first film from WAU Animation. It is directed by Usamah Zaid Yasin and co-written by Usamah himself, Shafiq Isa and Fuad Md Din.

The film is released simultaneously in 3 countries: Malaysia, Singapore, and Brunei on 28 November 2019, in Indonesia on 1 January 2020, and in Vietnam for the ASEAN Film Week 2020.

It has received positive reviews from audiences and critics locally, with praise for its action sequences, storyline, character developments and emotional depth. It grossed over RM30 million in Malaysia, making it the highest-grossing Malaysian animated film of all time.

A sequel film is being planned.

Plot 

The story starts with a flashback of 15 years. Two young women, Aliya and Niki sneak in a restricted cargo area and steal an artificial heart for an old woman named Mak Yah. Returning, they are intervened by pillar leaders. Trying to escape, Aliya is defeated and cornered, who forcefully insists Niki to escape with equipment, while she continues to fight the leaders.

In present, the plane carrying mayor of Cyberaya, Dato' Othman, is hijacked by four unknown heavily armoured intruders. He summons help from M.A.T.A and Ali arrives with his team for rescue. During fight, their leader detonates a bomb, damaging the craft. Mayor is ejected out, and intruders escape. The team struggles to handle the situation; Ali attempts to calibrate the plane but fails. Two new agents, Bobby (Inviso) and Fit (Techno) arrive for help. Bobby rescues the mayor and Fit stabilizes the plane with a new device's Over-ride mode mirroring to I.R.I.S, astonishing Ali. Ali is later briefed by Dayang and Ganz, about a new secret project of I.R.I.S Neo, based on the I.R.I.S ATLAS and override mode; and every agent was free to use the new prototype, also telling the history of I.R.I.S. Ali begins to doubt his original I.R.I.S and need in M.A.T.A, which is assured to have him a new unit. Reportedly, it was being tested by Bobby and Fit in present.

Back home at night, he finds a box of his mother, having its memories and toys. He also finds a lullaby music box of which he unknowingly turns the key in order to reveal a secret pen drive, with an emblem. He tries to access it, but is denied access which he doubts.
Next morning, he is called by Alicia in a 24-hour restaurant Mamak Maju. He is joined by Bakar too and they secretly travel underground to M.A.T.A Headquarters with the help of owners Rahul, Rajesh and Razman (M.A.T.A agents, allies of General Rama, and happening to be care-takers of Alicia since her Infancy) who distract customers by dance and music. Ali reports to the meeting room and is astonished with Dato' s presence. Upon being questioned by his presence, Dato' annoyingly reveals M.A.T.A to be established by him during his settlement of city; and every agent "serves only to him". General Rama briefs about the investigation of the previous day's attack on Dato': the primary fuel recovered from the bomb blast was Azurium and intruders' armors and weapons were not of Cyberaya. Rama orders a raid of a meeting of Brother Bear of an illegal arms deal on intel received from his spies, as he suspects the weaponries involved were smuggled to Bear by a dealer.

During the deal of Bear and a customer, Bakar tries to catch Bear, but plan goes wrong, and Bear escapes with the weapon. Ali chases him, when suddenly three people ground Bear. The third of their group, Niki, snatches the weapon; Bear escapes. Ali attacks the group in response, but Niki shortens up the melee, and runs away on her moped. Ali trails her from the city to a slum. He is unaware of the location and continues to case, when suddenly, he overruns a dead end, loses control, and hits unconscious.

Later, he wakes up in a warehouse, injured. Niki arrives to see him, who took him at her house after accident. Ali realizes the same symbol on the pendrive. He queries about it, and reveals the pendrive to Niki. Niki is surprised, and concludes him to be son of Aliya, her deceased friend. Niki tells the first time she met her in city; a weak girl of slum met by a kind-hearted Aliya, who also helped her people in "Fringe". She teamed up with Niki to fight those who dared upon the "Fringe", and loot the resources for their use by slum. Niki describes Azureum's use in Medicine, Sanitation, Hygiene, daily use for their people. Ali is shocked that the situation isn't addressed to Cyberaya authorities, and that they don't listen or care about. He is also told about shortage of Azureum to keep up the needs. Ali is met by Alicia and Bakar, and is informed of Bear's arrest.

In the conference with other Cyberaya's authorities, Dato' discusses about progress of a new project of a smart factory and demands the work to be completed in time. Bear's interrogation reveals the dealer to be Vikram, an operating officer at Beta Tower, working closely with important people in developing Cyberaya. General assigns a new mission to secretly investigate illegal activities in Beta Tower. Ali and team (with Bobby and Fit), sneak in the building and investigate. During the procedure, a secret Secret passage is discovered, which leads them to a secret godown at a hidden floor level, illegally hoarding weapons and resources. They gather evidence; while Ali discovers a secret storage of Azureum, and collects data to reveal it to Niki.

Back to the Fringe, Ali leaks details to Niki and her sidekicks, and plan a raid at night. They breach the security; while Vikram is notified and corners them with private personnel. Ali's I.R.I.S' Override mode helps them to escape. At Fringe, he joins the community feast, and meets Mak Yah, who calls him Aliya's 'avatar' and helping rejuvenate people. He spends time talking with Niki, telling about his recruitment as agent, and being sidelined due to new creation. The intruders gate crash creates a wide attention and demand for the action. Dato' storms on the pillar leaders and general for their "ineffectiveness". Rama doubts Vikram to be the mastermind behind Dato's attack, but informing it only enrages him, and he threatens to displace them. After his leave, Rama informs a new intel on finding Vikram's "nests" hoarding illegal armories, and designates investigation to the team. Ali begins sabotaging the missions: clearing out the "nests" with Niki previous night of mission, piling up resources and leaving nothing for agents next morning. M.A.T.A begins surging with the sabotage by "unknown".

This continues, till even the last building is cleared out, when Alicia observes tire tracks of Ali's scooter. She doubts his absence and excuses from missions. Next day at restaurant, she calls Ali and reveals his "theft" to which he initially denies, but gives in. She demands reason, when Ali reveals his frustration of being an agent of an organization, working for a selfish man, and leaves the place; without their awareness that their conversations were being secretly intercepted by the restaurateurs, and Bobby.

Returning home, he is trailed by the agents. He tries to get away from them and enters a grocery shop where he is encircled by agents in disguise, while Bakar with them asks Ali to come with him. He is reluctant to join, and narrowly escapes the place. He is confronted by Bobby and Fit: former chases him, till the city metro station. There, Ali tries to board a train, when is screwed up. In the shopping complex, they engage in a fight, when Ali knocks him out and runs away, while Alicia and Fit continue to chase him. Meanwhile, Ali calls Niki for help, she advises him to hide in Fringe and she would handle them. Fit finally blocks him at entrance Fringe's entrance and physically assaults him for his tyranny in helping the 'criminals'. He even removes Ali's I.R.I.S as a result, when Bakar and Alicia arrive to save Ali.

Bakar intervenes and engages in heated argument, which gives Ali some time to escape the side. Following him, they're trapped as soon as they cross the entrance. Niki arrives with her mates and takes down each of them. Ali witnesses the brutally, and reacts. Niki rebuffs him, saying that he should not loose himself for his few people. Ali realizes Niki's extremeness, and attacks, which she easily wins and knocks him out as well.

Later, they wake up in Niki's stay, all held captive. He realizes the intruders and Niki herself (All in armored suits), who had previously attacked Mayor. She reveals to have configured the I.R.I.S NEO, snatched from Fit during fight, and now she can access its overall functions. She reveals to have got the knowledge of I.R.I.S from the pen drive given to her by Ali: that is, the original device was created by Ali's mother, Aliya. Niki tells that few years back, at the time being grounded by M.A.T.A pillar agents, Aliya was offered to work for them because of her potential to which she agreed, and Niki felt betrayed from that day, and started to help her community by her own. After some years, while sneaking into secret defense facility of Cyberaya with sidekicks and stealing resources, she activated three missiles to hit the city, when again confronted by M.A.T.A, and this time, Aliya, who tried to stop her. Though Niki slipped away, she witnessed Aliya's death, when Aliya engaged the I.R.I.S override for first time and clashed the missiles mid-air, using her complete energy. Niki termed her sacrifice "useless" for Cyberaya, because she had a grudge for the selfish Mayor.

Meanwhile, in the slum, Vikram arrives with his goons, after knowing Niki to be the intruder, and demands her for revenge. She appears, and easily beats all using I.R.I.S Neo. At being hostage, Ali is consolidated by Bakar and encouraged by Alicia to use his "I.R.I.S" for escape, but he is already disheartened of his blind faith on Niki and is under-confident of stopping her. He is approached by Mak Yah for his kindness to the slum, and returns him the I.R.I.S, saying him not to wear-off his true identity and do his duty.

During the speech of Dato' at the inauguration of the newly created factory, Niki rampages the place and takes him hostage. She is confronted by Ali and team. Further recruits (wearing the new device) and then General Rama with his companions arrive for help; Niki begins loose, when her I.R.I.S Neo turns override, and everyone wearing get hypnotized, and start following her commands. In saving the mayor, Ali's team are grounded, when his I.R.I.S goes over-ride in hostage emergency.
He tries his best to defeat Niki, but is weakened by mind-controlled Ganz and Dayang, and knocked out by Niki.

Ali subconsciously finds himself in an unknown place, where he finds his mother, who reveals the place to be the Dimension of I.R.I.S; where Ali would often get whenever I.R.I.S went override, and the device would work on the stored data of his mother leaving nothing in his memory after the use. Ali is dismayed about the new invention, but is consolidated, that greatness never comes from a device, but the user and its determination. She also reveals that her stored data would be deleted if Ali tries to access the override mode. At first he is broken hearing the truth, but then strengthened by Aliya, to not lose his courage. Now, Ali controls override mode and clearly defeats Niki on her Dato's attack, and finally destroys her weapons. He tells her to give up, but Niki denies, and initiates the suicidal attempt to blast Azureum in her suit to kill everyone. Aliya's essence gets transferred to Niki's I.R.I.S, where she is trapped in the Dimension and Aliya separates the I.R.I.S from her. In aftermath, Niki regrets her madness, but is consoled by Bakar.

After few days, reporting mayor's recovery; Ganz heavily scolds Ali for his under ground support to criminals. On other hand, Dayang praises Ali for his duty, but also disappointedly states Ali to have punishment, and he is officially declared to get separated from his original I.R.I.S; the Neo project is disbanded of major flaws discovered. Ali willingly agrees, and vows to do his best in M.A.T.A and submits his I.R.I.S. After the meeting, Bakar shows Ali about his mother's moments that she served in M.A.T.A. In a last video, Bakar asks Aliya for reason to be an agent, to which she replies that there people to help, but all scattered; M.A.T.A need those so that people can come closer, know each other, and serve others selflessly. The very next day, Ali, his father and his friend Viktor visit the Fringe. Dr Ghazhali announces the Peripheral Development Project for Fringe, promising a sustainable development of both urban and rural communities. In evening, Ali is shown to have a get-together feast in Mamak Maju, with his team, accompanied with General, his friends, and Bobby-Fit.

In the mid-credit scene, Dayang is shown to assign Ali's name to a superdroid, dubbed for a new Project "Satria". In the post-credit scene, after Ali takes leave from restaurant, Rizwan and Dos are shown to be present there all the time, and then follow him.

Cast 

Bahasa Malaysia

 Ida Rahayu Yusoff, as Ali & Comot
 Nabilah Rais, as Niki
 Noorhayati Maslini Omar, as Alicia
 Shafiq Isa, as Bakar
 Azman Zulkiply, as General Rama
 Salina Salmee Mohd Ali, as Aliya
 Abu Shafian Abd Hamid, as Dato' Othman
 Ahmad Sufian Mazilan, as Bobby
 Megat Zahrin Megat Hisham, as Fit
 Azuan Wanji, as Vikram
 Altimet, as Andik
 Amir Mustaqim, as Surya
 Fadhli Shafian, as Abang Bear

English

 Steven Bones, as Ali
 Ida Rahayu Yusoff, as Comot
 Anita Woo, as Niki
 Denise Chan, as Alicia
 Azman Zulkiply, as General Rama, Bakar & Viktor
 Gavin Yap, as Fit & Andik

Production 
The film costs RM6.5 million to produce, including promotion cost. The filmmaking team consists of a total of 80 local animation designers and graphic artists. The production of this film uses high-quality digital technology. The average crews who produced this animated movie is between the ages of 25 and 28. The process of filmmaking took about one and a half years to be finished.

Soundtrack 

The music score is composed by the lead composer, Azri Yunus, assisted by the assistant composer, Hakim Kamal. Azri Yunus stated that the difference of the music score in the series with this film is they wanted to put more ecstatic value by putting in more emotional feelings to make audiences in the cinemas attached. The official soundtrack album of the film is released on 27 December 2019.

"Bukalah Matamu" is the first single released from the official soundtrack, released on YouTube and all streaming platforms on 20 September 2019. The song sends a message to people who have everything to open their eyes and improve themselves.

However, "Bukalah Matamu" went into a controversy where it was claimed that the song has a similarity with a song ''The Calling'' from foreign artists TheFatRat and Laura Brehm. The director, Usamah has explained that they have no intention to imitate the song as claimed by most people. They made the song by making a few group bands as references, such as Linkin Park and Daft Punk. When the crew realized that the song has similarities with "The Calling", they were surprised and immediately contacted TheFatRat to explain the situation, while offering them credit to the song and a bit of royalty from the film.

"Kita Jaga Kita" is the second single released from the official soundtrack. The lyrics of the songs comes from the perspective of the people of the fictional urban slum Pinggiran in Cyberaya. In March 2020, the single is used as the theme song for the national COVID-19 prevention campaign and Movement Control Order by the Malaysian Government through the #kitajagakita hashtag. On 31 August 2020, in celebration of the country's 63rd Independence Day, an official music video of the song is released, which is dedicated to all frontliners across Malaysia.

Release 
WAU Animation announced this film project when they released their first teaser trailer for this movie on 7 August 2018. The second teaser trailer is released on 29 March 2019. The first official trailer was premiered on 1 August 2019, while the second official trailer was premiered on 9 October 2019.

On 2 October 2019, WAU Animation had officially released the official theatrical poster of the film, which also revealed the release date for Malaysian cinemas. It was released in 146 cinemas in Malaysia, 8 in Singapore and 7 in Brunei. There was also a possibility of it being screened in 50 countries but Ahmad Izham Omar, CEO of Primeworks Studios ultimately denied of releasing the movie further in all countries, and stated that they had finalized the release with their selective countries and they won't be expanding to further international release. For the Indonesian market, the film is released in CGV, Kota Cinemas, Platinum Cineplex and Flix Indonesia on 1 January 2020.

In Vietnam, the film was screened in the country as representative of Malaysia in the ASEAN Film Week 2020. This is the only animated-featured film to join the event. The film was screened for free for the public in 3 major cities holding the event, including the capital Hanoi, Da Nang and Ho Chi Minh city. The first screening session of the movie in Vietnam was on July 21, 2020, in the National Cinema Center in Hanoi.
In Brazil, it was released on April 16, 2021, for representing Malaysia at Brazilian film festival.

On 14 February, its release in Uzbekistan was confirmed announced.

Subsequently, the film was also released on the local TV channels, and regional OTT platforms, like Astro-First, regional Netflix as well as Disney+ Hotstar for Malaysia only.

Sequel
After the great success achieved over time and awards for the film, its new sequel is being planned by the co-producers of WAU Animation, and a new storyline is being discussed.

Reception 

Ejen Ali: The Movie has grossed over RM30 million in Malaysia. Originally, WAU Animation targeted RM20 million for the local market for this film, in which the film achieved in only 14 days of screening. It has surpassed another 2019 Malaysian animation film BoBoiBoy Movie 2 (RM30 million), making it the highest-grossing local Malaysian animated film of all time, until it was surpassed by 
Mechamato Movie in 2022, the highest-grossing Malaysian film in 2019 and the third highest-grossing Malaysian film of all time.

Awards and nominations

References

External links 
 

Malaysian animated films
2010s spy films
Animated action films
2019 films